is a Japanese former swimmer. She competed at the 1960 Summer Olympics in the 400 metres freestyle and the 4x100 metres freestyle relay, and the 1964 Summer Olympics in the 400 metres individual medley, but did not reach the finals in any of her events.

References

External links
 

1943 births
Living people
Japanese female freestyle swimmers
Japanese female medley swimmers
Olympic swimmers of Japan
Swimmers at the 1960 Summer Olympics
Swimmers at the 1964 Summer Olympics
Sportspeople from Aichi Prefecture
Asian Games medalists in swimming
Asian Games gold medalists for Japan
Swimmers at the 1962 Asian Games
Medalists at the 1962 Asian Games
20th-century Japanese women